Baseball Fever is a novel written by Johanna Hurwitz and published in 1981 by William Morrow and Company. 

It features Ezra Feldman as the protagonist, depicted with an obsession to baseball. The book is primarily centered on Ezra and his struggle to get his scholarly father interested in baseball, his father loathing it and instead preferring chess and sociology.

The book is set primarily in Flushing, New York, although the story includes Princeton, New Jersey, and other locations.

Development
Johanna Hurwitz conceived the book after realizing that her children were "obsessed" with baseball; the plot developed into a situation between a father and a son.

References
Notes

Footnotes

1981 novels
Baseball novels
Novels set in New York City
William Morrow and Company books